Thembisile Nkadimeng (born 1972 or 1973) is a South African politician for the African National Congress. She is the current Minister of Cooperative Governance and Traditional Affairs, in office since March 2023. She had previously served as Deputy Minister Cooperative Governance and Traditional Affairs from 2021 to 2023.

Education
Nkadimeng holds a Bachelor of Arts (honours) degree and a higher education diploma from the University of the North. She earned a Bachelor of Philosophy in Political Studies from Stellenbosch University. She has also completed an advanced programme in management at Wits Business School.

Career
Nkadimeng is a member of the African National Congress. In July 2014, she was elected mayor of the Polokwane Local Municipality following the resignation of Freddy Greaver. She was re-elected as mayor at a council sitting after the 2016 local elections.

In June 2019, Nkadimeng was elected president of the South African Local Government Association (SALGA). She was previously the provincial chairperson of SALGA in Limpopo.

National government
On 5 August 2021, Nkadimeng was appointed as Deputy Minister of  Cooperative Governance and Traditional Affairs by President Cyril Ramaphosa. She then resigned as mayor and as SALGA president. She was sworn into office on 10 August. Nkadimeng was promoted to Minister of Cooperative Governance and Traditional Affairs during a cabinet reshuffle on 6 March 2023.

References

External links
Thembi Nkadimeng, Ms at Government of South Africa

Living people
Year of birth missing (living people)
Place of birth missing (living people)
African National Congress politicians
Mayors of places in South Africa
University of Limpopo alumni
Stellenbosch University alumni
Women government ministers of South Africa